Scottdale is a census-designated place (CDP) in DeKalb County, Georgia, United States. The population was 10,631 at the 2010 census.

Geography
Scottdale, aka SCD is located at  (33.794337, -84.262110).  The unincorporated community is centered on East Ponce de Leon Avenue, between Decatur and Clarkston. The northern boundary is Stone Mountain Freeway; the eastern boundary is Interstate 285; the western boundary is roughly DeKalb Industrial Way; and the southern boundary is roughly the city limits of Avondale Estates.  The ZIP code for Scottdale is 30079.

Demographics

2020 census

As of the 2020 United States census, there were 10,698 people, 4,321 households, and 2,277 families residing in the CDP.

2010 census
According to the 2010 census, there were 10,631 people living in the CDP. The racial makeup of the CDP was 29.9% White, 37.7% African American, 0.20% Native American, 23.0% Asian, 0.01% Pacific Islander, 2.3% from other races, and 3.8% from two or more races. Hispanic or Latino of any race were 5.3% of the population. 12.7% of the population are Asian Indians.

2000 census
As of the census of 2000, there were 9,803 people, 4,010 households, and 2,201 families living in the CDP. The racial makeup of Scottdale was 48.6% Black, 37.1% White, 0.19% Native American, 9.60% Asian, 0.18% Pacific Islander, 1.7% from other races, and 2.65% from two or more races. Hispanic or Latino of any race were 4.5% of the population.

There were 4,010 households, out of which 67.3% had children under the age of 18 living with them, 29.8% were married couples living together, 69.1% had a female householder with no husband present, and 45.1% were non-families. 18.5% of all households were made up of individuals, and 5.5% had someone living alone who was 65 years of age or older.  The average household size was 2.44 and the average family size was 3.15.

In the CDP, the population was spread out, with 34.5% under the age of 18, 12.0% from 18 to 24, 39.3% from 25 to 44, 16.7% from 45 to 64, and 7.5% who were 65 years of age or older.  The median age was 31 years. For every 100 females, there were 90.9 males.  For every 100 females age 18 and over, there were 64.4 males.

The median income for a household in the CDP was $18,731, and the median income for a family was $27,521. Males had a median income of $27,489 versus $21,813 for females. The per capita income for the CDP was $24,262.  About 54.24% of families and 76.4% of the population were below the poverty line, including 44.6% of those under age 18 and 32.3% of those age 65 or over.

History
Scottdale is named for Colonel George Washington Scott, who founded the Scottdale Cotton Mill in the late 1800s. Colonel Scott arrived in DeKalb County from Florida, where he had previously owned a plantation, served in the Confederate Army, and unsuccessfully run for governor. Col. Scott was also a benefactor of the female seminary that became Agnes Scott College.

The Scottdale Cotton Mill development included the mill and nearby housing for workers.  From the 1920s through the 1940s, Scottdale Manufacturing Company even supported a baseball team.  The mill shut down in 1982, and workers found jobs elsewhere in metro Atlanta. Philanthropist Tobie Grant donated several acres of property to disenfranchised, unemployed African-Americans and created a community known as Tobie Grant. This community continues to house low-income African Americans. Oak Forest Apartments was also opened under this theme in 1968.  
 
The commercial district in Scottdale is focused on East Ponce de Leon Avenue, which bisects the community from the southwest to the northeast.  Your DeKalb Farmers Market and antique shops are located on this road, along with several auto body shops and industrial buildings. Steel LLC maintains a large steel fabrication and distribution facility in Scottdale, near the intersection of North Clarendon Avenue and East Ponce de Leon Avenue. Efforts to rehabilitate East Ponce de Leon Avenue commenced in 2007.

Education

 Avondale Middle School, 3131 Old Rockbridge Rd.
 Robert Shaw Theme Elementary School, 385 Glendale Rd. DeKalb County Elementary School.
 Hamilton High School (Scottdale, Georgia) and Robert Shaw Elementary School, DeKalb County, closed 1969
 Avondale High School at 1192 Clarendon Road, closed in 2011 and was converted to a Performance Arts only campus.
 Druid Hills High School in Decatur, Georgia

Parks & recreation

 Cedar Park, 3165 Cedar St.  Three acre DeKalb County park with a multi-use field, basketball court, multi-use court, playground and picnic area.
 Hamilton Recreation Center & Park, 3262 Chapel St. Eight acre DeKalb County park with a softball field, football field, a multi-use field, recreation center and playground.
 Needham Park, McLendon Dr. & East Ponce de Leon Ave. Greenspace park.
Tobie Grant Park, Pool & Recreation Center

References

Census-designated places in DeKalb County, Georgia
Census-designated places in Georgia (U.S. state)
Census-designated places in the Atlanta metropolitan area